WXYR-LP (104.5 FM) is a radio station licensed to Monticello, Kentucky, United States.  The station is currently owned by Genesis Appalachian Project, Inc.

References

External links
 

XYR-LP
XYR-LP
Monticello, Kentucky